JAXART Records is a Southern California based record label founded in 2007 by Ashley Jex of the MP3 blog Rock Insider. The label began releasing vinyl and digital albums for artists from Southern California and beyond.

JAXART Records has since released vinyl singles for artist such as Mezzanine Owls, The Henry Clay People, The Parson Red Heads, RACES (Debut LP Out Mar. 27th via Frenchkiss Records), Steffaloo, Sevendys, Polls, and more. In 2012 JAXART will release the debut full length from Southern California DIY band So Many Wizards – performers at The Smell and pehrspace music venues.

References

External links
Ashley Jex Interview On LAist
JAXART in LA Weekly 
JAXART Records Official Site
JAXART Feature in NYLON June 2008 

American record labels
Companies based in California
Record labels established in 2007